Quercylurus major is an extinct nimravid carnivoran, or "false sabre-tooth," from the early Oligocene of France.  Its fossils are found from Early Oligocene strata in Quercy. Q. major was possibly the largest nimravid ever known, as its fossils suggest it was similar in size to the modern-day brown bear and was scansorial. It was very muscular, walked on plantigrade (flat-footed). So far, there is only one described species within this genus - Q. major.
The species lived in the moist and humid forests of Oligocene Europe alongside fellow nimravid Eofelis. It was an apex predator in its environment, and it is likely that it hunted large ungulates by ambush.

Taxonomy
Quercylurus was named by Ginsburg (1979). It was assigned to Felidae by Carroll (1988), but later, it was then later placed within Nimravidae.

References

Nimravidae
Oligocene feliforms
Oligocene mammals of Europe
Paleogene France
Fossils of France
 
Prehistoric carnivoran genera